Osvaldo Ramón Núñez Riquelme, also known as Osvaldo Nunez (born 10 September 1938 in Curicó, Chile) was a member of the House of Commons of Canada from 1993 to 1997. His career has been in law, arbitration and labour.

He was elected in the Bourassa electoral district under the Bloc Québécois party in the 1993 federal election, thus serving in the 35th Canadian Parliament. Nunez lost to Liberal Denis Coderre in the 1997 federal election and did not return to Canadian politics.

References
 

1938 births
Living people
Bloc Québécois MPs
Members of the House of Commons of Canada from Quebec
Chilean emigrants to Canada
People from Curicó